Yvon Dupuis,  (October 11, 1926 – January 1, 2017) was a Canadian politician.

Political career
Born in Montreal, Dupuis was educated at Collège de Varennes in Longeuil, Quebec, and worked as an insurance agent and as the owner of two music stores prior to running for elected office.

He was first elected to the National Assembly of Quebec in the 1952 provincial election in the riding of Montréal–Sainte-Marie as a member of the Liberal Party of Quebec. He was defeated in the 1956 provincial election. He ran unsuccessfully as an independent Liberal in Saint-Jean—Iberville—Napierville in the 1957 federal election, but was successful as the Liberal Party of Canada candidate in the same riding in the 1958 federal election. He was re-elected in the 1962 and 1963 elections. He was appointed Parliamentary Secretary to the Secretary of State by Prime Minister Lester Pearson on May 14, 1963, and served in that role until he was appointed minister without portfolio on February 3, 1964.

He was accused of accepting a bribe related to the licensing of a new race track in his riding, and resigned from the cabinet on January 22, 1965. He was the first cabinet member in Canadian history to resign under criminal charges. He was defeated as an independent Liberal candidate in the 1965 federal election. Dupuis was acquitted of the corruption charges on April 16, 1968.

On February 4, 1973, he was elected leader of the Ralliement créditiste du Québec, but failed to win election in Saint-Jean in the 1973 provincial election. Under pressure to resign as leader, he left the party and founded the Parti présidentiel on May 5, 1974. He resigned as leader of his new party on October 21, 1974, and announced the end of his political career. He was replaced as leader by Yvon Brochu, who merged the party with the Union Nationale on May 31, 1975.

Post-political activities
Dupuis later worked as a radio announcer on CKVL, CKAC, CHLT and CIBL radio stations. He was the president of Publivox Inc., and owner of Agence de Voyages Yvon Dupuis Inc. from 1981 to 2003. He died on January 1, 2017, at the age of 90.

See also
Politics of Quebec
List of Quebec general elections
National Assembly of Quebec
Timeline of Quebec history
List of political parties in Quebec

References

External links

1926 births
2017 deaths
Canadian radio personalities
Liberal Party of Canada MPs
Members of the House of Commons of Canada from Quebec
Members of the King's Privy Council for Canada
Politicians from Montreal
Quebec Liberal Party MNAs
Quebec political party leaders
French Quebecers